Manduca dalica is a moth of the  family Sphingidae.

Distribution 
It is known from Brazil, Peru, Bolivia, Venezuela and Costa Rica.

Description 
The wingspan is 120–135 mm. The upperside is generally dark, with mottled white forewing bases, connected by a similar pattern across the posterior part of the thorax. There is a large, prominent, white discal spot and a whitish apical mark.

Biology 
Adults have been recorded in February and from April to October in Costa Rica and in November in Brazil. There are probably three generations per year.

Subspecies 
Manduca dalica dalica (Peru, Bolivia, Venezuela and Costa Rica)
Manduca dalica anthina (Jordan, 1911) (south-eastern Brazil)

References

Manduca
Moths described in 1877
Taxa named by William Forsell Kirby